Duke of Aubigny is a title that was created in the Peerage of France in 1684. It was granted by King Louis XIV of France to Louise de Kérouaille, the last mistress of King Charles II of England, and to descend to Charles's illegitimate issue by her, namely to the descendants of Charles Lennox, 1st Duke of Richmond, 1st Duke of Lennox (1672–1723) of Goodwood House in Sussex. Louis XIV also granted her the Château de la Verrerie, a former secondary seat of the Stewart Seigneurs d'Aubigny, Franco-Scottish cousins of the Stewart monarchs, seated from 1422 to 1672 at the Château d'Aubigny in the parish and manor of Aubigny-sur-Nère in the ancient province of Berry in France.

The ducal title, with accompanying grant of arms and of lands, were an attempt by Charles II to place his youngest illegitimate son into the persona of his much beloved and recently extinct Franco-Scottish cousins, the Stewart Seigneurs d'Aubigny, the last in the male line of whom was Charles Stewart, 3rd Duke of Richmond, 6th Duke of Lennox (1639–1672) of Cobham Hall in Kent and of Richmond House in London.

During the Auld Alliance between the Kingdom of Scotland and the Ancien Régime of France, the Château d'Aubigny had been granted in 1422 by King Charles VII of France to Sir John Stewart of Darnley, 1st Comte d'Évreux, 1st Seigneur de Concressault, 1st Seigneur d'Aubigny ( 1380–1429), a famous military commander who served as Constable of the Scottish Army in France, supporting the French against the English during the Hundred Years War, and a fourth cousin of King James I of Scotland (reigned 1406 to 1437), the third monarch of the House of Stewart. The Stewarts of Darnley were a junior branch of Stewart of Bonkyll, of Bonkyll Castle in Scotland, descended from Alexander Stewart, 4th High Steward of Scotland (died 1283), whose senior great-grandson was King Robert II of Scotland (1371–1390), the first monarch of the House of Stewart.

King James VI & I of Scotland and England (grandson of Robert II) united the senior royal line of Stewart (represented by his mother Mary, Queen of Scots) with the junior branch of Stewart of Darnley, as his father (Henry Stewart, Lord Darnley) was that family's senior representative, being the son and heir apparent of Matthew Stewart, 4th Earl of Lennox (1516–1571). King James VI & I inherited the title of Earl of Lennox, as nominal 5th Earl, when that title merged into the crown, as had done the Earldom of Richmond in 1485 on the accession to the throne of Henry Tudor, Earl of Richmond, as King Henry VII of England. These titles were re-granted by the Stewart monarchs to their beloved Franco-Scottish cousins, the Stewarts of Aubigny.

History

The lord of the manor of Aubigny-sur-Nère, a substantial walled town, was known in France as the Seigneur d'Aubigny ("lord of Aubigny"). It was a territorial title rather than a peerage title, and thus was able to be given by a Seigneur to a younger son, where for example the elder son already had a great estate and titles.

The first ducal holder was Louise de Kérouaille, the French-born last mistress of King Charles II of England and Scotland. In 1684, at the request of Charles II, the French King Louis XIV created her "Duchess of Aubigny" in the Peerage of France. However, the letters patent creating the Duchy were not registered by the Paris Parliament, so the dukedom became extinct at the Duchess' death in 1734. In 1777, King Louis XV issued lettres de suranation, which restored the 1684 peerage to her heirs. Charles Lennox, 1st Duke of Richmond and 1st Duke of Lennox (1672–1723), her son by King Charles II, had predeceased her, but her grandson Charles Lennox, 2nd Duke of Richmond, had already received a brevet de duc (i.e., a ducal patent), which gave him the honours of a duke at the French royal court. The French dukedom was confiscated during the Revolutionary and Napoleonic Wars (1792–1803 and 1806–1814), but it was finally returned to Charles Lennox, 4th Duke of Richmond, the nephew and heir of the 3rd Duke of Richmond, who also succeeded to the Dukedom of Aubigny according to ancient Salic law.

The English coat of arms of the Lennox Dukes of Richmond display an inescutcheon of gules, three buckles or, which are their French arms as Dukes of Aubigny. These arms were created as a difference from the French arms granted in 1428 by King Charles VII of France to John Stewart of Darnley, 1st Seigneur d'Aubigny, 1st Seigneur de Concressault, 1st Comte d'Évreux, and Constable of the Scottish Army in France, the outstanding warrior who commanded the Scottish army in France that was instrumental in saving the throne of Charles VII from the English invasionary forces under King Henry V of England. In 1428, John Stewart of Darnley was awarded by King Charles VII of France "the glorious privilege of quartering the royal arms of France with his paternal arms". This was in the form of the royal French arms differenced by a bordure gules charged with buckles or, specified to appear in the 1st and 4th quarters of greatest honour.

The bordure gules charged with buckles or is a reference to the arms of Stewart of Bonkyll, who bore Stewart differenced by a bordure gules charged with buckles or (an example of canting arms: buckles for Bonkyl).

The chateau and appurtenances are no longer the family's, as they were sold off to maintain their other legacies or assets. Aubigny is the chief tourist attraction in France which attests to the Auld Alliance. The honour is now only an historic title.

Stewart Seigneurs d'Aubigny
 John Stewart, 1st Lord of Aubigny (killed 1429)
 John Stewart, 2nd Lord of Aubigny (died 1482)
 Bernard Stewart, 3rd Lord of Aubigny (died 1508)
 Robert Stewart, 4th Lord of Aubigny (died 1543)
 John Stewart, 5th Lord of Aubigny (died 1567)
 Esmé Stewart, 6th Lord of Aubigny (died 1583)
 Esmé Stewart, 7th Lord of Aubigny (died 1624)
 Henry Stewart, 8th Lord of Aubigny (died 1632)
 George Stewart, 9th Lord of Aubigny (killed 1642)
 Ludovic Stewart, 10th Lord of Aubigny (died 1665)
 Charles Stewart, 11th Lord of Aubigny (died 1672)

Lennox Dukes of Aubigny

 Louise de Kérouaille, 1st Duchess of Portsmouth, Duchess of Aubigny (1649-1734). Dukedom and Peerage extinct at her death.
 Charles Lennox, 1st Duke of Richmond, 1st Duke of Lennox, Duke of Aubigny (1672-1723), jointly with his mother Louise de Kéroualle.
 Charles Lennox, 2nd Duke of Richmond, 2nd Duke of Lennox (1701-1750). Only a "Brevet Duke" and not a Duke and Peer.
 Charles Lennox, 3rd Duke of Richmond, 3rd Duke of Lennox, Duke of Aubigny (1734-1806). Restored to Peerage in 1777.
 Charles Lennox, 4th Duke of Richmond, 4th Duke of Lennox, Duke of Aubigny (1764-1819)
 Charles Gordon-Lennox, 5th Duke of Richmond, 5th Duke of Lennox, Duke of Aubigny (1791-1860)
 Charles Henry Gordon-Lennox, 6th Duke of Richmond, 6th Duke of Lennox, Duke of Aubigny, 1st Duke of Gordon (1818-1903)
 Charles Henry Gordon-Lennox, 7th Duke of Richmond, 7th Duke of Lennox, Duke of Aubigny, 2nd Duke of Gordon (1845-1928)
 Charles Henry Gordon-Lennox, 8th Duke of Richmond, 8th Duke of Lennox, Duke of Aubigny, 3rd Duke of Gordon (1870-1935)
 Frederick Charles Gordon-Lennox, 9th Duke of Richmond, 9th Duke of Lennox, Duke of Aubigny, 4th Duke of Gordon (1904-1989)
 Charles Henry Gordon-Lennox, 10th Duke of Richmond, 10th Duke of Lennox, Duke of Aubigny, 5th Duke of Gordon (1929-2017)
 Charles Gordon-Lennox, 11th Duke of Richmond, 11th Duke of Lennox, Duke of Aubigny, 6th Duke of Gordon (b. 1955)

See also
List of French peerages
Duke of Richmond
Duke of Lennox
Duke of Gordon

Further reading
Cust, Lady Elizabeth, Some Account of the Stuarts of Aubigny, in France, London, 1891 
G. E. Cokayne, The Complete Peerage, n.s., vol.VII, 1929, p. 602, note (e)

References

External links
The Stuarts of Darnley, seigneurs d'Aubigny
The Auld Alliance, Aubigny-sur-Nère and The Stewarts. 

House of Stuart
Aubigny